Fever In Fever Out is the second studio album by American alternative rock band Luscious Jackson. It was released on October 29, 1996, on Grand Royal and Capitol Records.

The album peaked at number 72 on the Billboard 200 chart, as well as number 55 on the UK Albums Chart. As of 2000, it had sold more than 500,000 copies.

Track listing

Personnel

Luscious Jackson

Jill Cunniff – vocals (1, 4–5, 7–10, 13–14), guitar (1, 5, 8, 10, 13–14), bass guitar (1, 4–11, 13–14)
Gabrielle Glaser – vocals (2, 6, 11), guitar (2, 4, 6–7, 9, 11), drum programming (2), lead guitar (8)
Vivian Trimble – keyboards (1, 4–7, 9–11), keyboard strings (2), mellotron (8–9), piano (8, 14), backing vocals (9–10), outro vocals (9), Hammond organ (13)
Kate Schellenbach – drums (1, 4–11, 13–14)

Additional musicians
Daniel Lanois – slide guitar (8, 10), mando-guitar (10), bass guitar (11)
Tony Mangurian – mellotron (1), acoustic guitar (1), drum fills (1), drum programming (1, 5, 14), timpanies (2), programming (8), bongos (9), bass pedals (14)
Alex Young – additional drum looping (1, 5), DJ whales/wails (7, 9), artistic record scratches (13)
Daryl Johnson – backing vocals (6), hand drum (6)
The Guiro Brothers – percussion (6–7, 11)
Emmylou Harris – backing vocals (9–11)
N'Dea Davenport – backing vocals (11)

Technical
Daniel Lanois – co-producer (1–14), co-mixing (2–14), inside sleeve photography
Tony Mangurian – co-producer (1–14), co-mixing (1–14)
Luscious Jackson – co-producers (4, 7, 9), co-mixing (2–5, 7–12, 14)
Jamie Candiloro – co-mixing (1–5, 7–12, 14)
Jill Cunniff – co-producer (1, 5, 8, 10, 13–14), co-mixing (1)
Gabrielle Glaser – co-producer (2, 6, 11)
Mark Howard – co-mixing (6, 13)
Greg Calbi – mastering
Kathy Guild – art direction
Kim Biggs – art direction, inside sleeve and back cover design
Rob Schroeder – design
Bob Lanois – inside sleeve photography
Matthew Horovitz – CD photograph

Charts

Weekly charts

Year-end charts

References

External links
 

1996 albums
Albums produced by Daniel Lanois
Grand Royal albums
Luscious Jackson albums